The 1980 National Soccer League season was the fifty-seventh season under the National Soccer League (NSL) name. The season began in May 1980 and concluded in October 1980 with the NSL Championship final where Toronto Panhellenic defeated St. Catharines Roma. The Toronto Falcons won the regular-season title but were defeated by Toronto Italia for the NSL Cup.

The NSL was operative in the United States and Northern Ontario for the final time in the league's history.

Overview 
The decade ushered in a unique era in Canadian soccer as many attempts and proposals at forming a national major soccer league were executed throughout the 1980s. The first notable example occurred in 1980 when several investors presented a nationwide soccer league known as the Canadian Soccer League (CSL) to debut in 1981. Before the commencement of any season the project initially debuted in a tournament known as the Red Leaf Cup, which featured teams from Europe and Brazil. The planned Canadian Soccer League failed to materialize and the next attempt at creating a domestic national league successfully occurred in 1983.

Meanwhile, the Ontario-centered National Soccer League (NSL) continued having a presence in Northern Ontario with Sudbury Cyclones representing the city of Sudbury, and an American representative from Upstate New York known as the Buffalo Blazers. The membership in the league decreased to twelve clubs as the NSL lost its presence in Quebec, and Detroit, Michigan as the Montreal Stars, Detroit Besa, and Detroit Vardar departed. While the Hamilton Italo-Canadians requested a sabbatical and returned for the 1981 season. Buffalo was denied participation in the playoffs because of financial and player issues.

A friendly tournament known as the Toronto International Soccer Cup was organized with Toronto First Portuguese and Toronto Panhellenic representing the NSL against S.L. Benfica, and Partizan Belgrade. Benfica would win the tournament after defeating Belgrade in the final.

Teams

Final standings

Playoffs

Finals

Cup  
The cup tournament was a separate contest from the rest of the season, in which all twelve teams took part. All the matches were separate from the regular season, and the teams were grouped into two separate divisions. The two winners in the group stage would advance in a two-legged match final for the Cup.

Finals

References

External links
RSSSF CNSL page
thecnsl.com - 1980 season

1980–81 domestic association football leagues
National Soccer League
1980